Pakhtoon Yar Khan is a Pakistani politician who had been a member of the Provincial Assembly of Khyber Pakhtunkhwa from August 2018 to January 2023. His father, Attaullah Jan, was also a seasoned politician.

Political career

He was elected to the Provincial Assembly of Khyber Pakhtunkhwa as a candidate of Pakistan Tehreek-e-Insaf from Constituency PK-88 (Bannu-II) in 2018 Pakistani general election.

References

External links
Pakhtoon yar Khan | KP Assembly

Living people
Pakistan Tehreek-e-Insaf MPAs (Khyber Pakhtunkhwa)
Year of birth missing (living people)